This Man's Navy (aka Airship Squadron No. 4. and  Lighter Than Air) is a 1945 World War II film about U.S. Navy blimps directed by William A. Wellman and starring Wallace Beery, Tom Drake, Jan Clayton and James Gleason. The supporting cast features Selena Royle and Beery's brother Noah Beery Sr., and presents a rare opportunity to see both Beery brothers work together in their later years. The picture is also one of the very few films, other than training films, to depict U.S. Navy airship operations.

Plot
During World War II, Chief Aviation Pilot Ned Trumpet (Wallace Beery) is the commander of a blimp at Lakehurst, New Jersey naval base. "Old Gas Bag", who has a reputation for telling tall tales,  brags about his fictional son to his skeptical friend Jimmy Shannon (James Gleason) and, then realizes that he will need to find someone to impersonate his "son". By chance, Trumpet soon meets Jess Weaver (Tom Drake), a young disabled man, arranging for an operation to fix his legs, injured in a riding accident. Afterward, Weaver agrees to go along with the deception and soon earns his Navy wings and commission as an ensign.

While piloting a blimp on a submarine patrol mission, Trumpet launches an unauthorized attack on a German submarine (ignoring orders sent to break off the attack), but Weaver's bomb misses and the submarine fires back, hitting the airship. Trumpet takes over the controls and sinks the submarine. Weaver faces a court-martial for disobeying orders, but Trumpet takes the blame for his actions. After Weaver is awarded the Distinguished Flying Cross, he gives the DFC ribbon to his "father." Leaving Lakehurst, Weaver gets pilot training at NAS Pensacola.

Weaver transfers to Ferry Command. While on assignment in Burma, his airplane crashes in Japanese territory. Trumpet rushes to the rescue in a blimp. Fending off Japanese soldiers, the crew pick up three survivors, the fourth being killed. They are then attacked by three fighter aircraft.

With the airship punctured and losing helium, the crew jettison as much as they can to gain altitude; when that is not enough to reach clouds to hide in, both Trumpet and Shannon parachute out.

Allied P-38 Lightnings fly to their rescue. Afterward, Trumpet and Shannon return to base in triumph. Weaver indicates that he will be returning to the lighter-than-air service at Lakehurst, to reunite with his "father."

Cast
 Wallace Beery as Ned Trumpet
 Tom Drake as Jess Weaver
 James Gleason as Jimmy Shannon
 Jan Clayton as Cathey Cortland
 Selena Royle as Maude Weaver
 Noah Beery, Sr. as Joe Hodum
 Henry O'Neill as Roger Graystone
 Steve Brodie as Tim Shannon 
 George Chandler as Bert Bland  
 Donald Curtis as Operations Officer 
 Arthur Walsh as Cadet Rayshek 
 Will Fowler as David
 Richard Crockett as "Sparks"
 Blake Edwards (uncredited)

Production
This Man's Navy was an example of Hollywood's relentless wartime efforts to portray all the fighting units of the U.S. military in a film. Wallace Beery served in the U.S. Navy as a blimp commander, and on his discharge, was instrumental in convincing MGM to produce a film in tribute to his former command. Beery asked for and received complete cooperation from the U.S. Navy in making This Man's Navy. Some scenes for the movie were filmed at the Naval Lighter-Than-Air Station, Santa Ana, California.

Reception
One of the typical potboilers  Beery made in the 1940s, This Man's Navy received a typical reaction from critics and public alike. The New York Times dismissed the film as pleasant fare but, "...while nominally a topical adventure, the film is largely devoted to Mr. Beery disporting himself as of yore. As a rough-hewn, golden-hearted chief petty officer in the Navy's blimp service, he is scarcely different from Beery the erstwhile marine, gob, etc."

Aviation film historian Michael Paris in From the Wright Brothers to Top Gun: Aviation, Nationalism, and Popular Cinema (1995) noted that This Man's Navy hearkened back to an earlier era. Paris wrote, the film "is something of a throwback to the melodramatic style of the pre-war years and is strangely at odds with the realistic and sombre mood of Wing and a Prayer."

References

Notes

Citations

Bibliography

 Hardwick, Jack and Ed Schnepf. "A Viewer's Guide to Aviation Movies." The Making of the Great Aviation Films, General Aviation Series, Volume 2, 1989.
 Heiser, Wayne H. U.S. Naval and Marine Corps Reserve Aviation, V. I, 1916 - 1942 Chronology. McHenry, IL: Dihedral Press, 2006. .
 Koppes, Clayton R. and Gregory D. Black. Hollywood Goes to War: How Politics, Profits and Propaganda Shaped World War II Movies. New York, The Free Press, 1987. .
 Paris, Michael. From the Wright Brothers to Top Gun: Aviation, Nationalism, and Popular Cinema. Manchester, UK: Manchester University Press, 1995. .

External links
 
 
 MSN: This Man's Navy

1945 films
1940s war adventure films
American aviation films
1940s English-language films
Films directed by William A. Wellman
Metro-Goldwyn-Mayer films
Films about the United States Navy in World War II
Films scored by Nathaniel Shilkret
American war adventure films
1945 war films
1940s American films